"Some People" is a song by English singer Cliff Richard, released in August 1987 as the second single from his 1987 studio album, Always Guaranteed. The song reached number three on the UK Singles Chart and was certified silver by the British Phonographic Industry (BPI) for shipments over 250,000. The song reached the top 10 in several other countries as well.

The song was written by Alan Tarney, who had previously written some of Richard's most successful tracks since his 1976 renaissance, including "We Don't Talk Anymore", "Dreamin'", "A Little in Love" and "Wired for Sound". A live version of the song was released in 1990 on Richard's From a Distance: The Event album.

Track listings
UK 7-inch single (EM 18)
 "Some People"
 "One Time Lover Man"

UK 12-inch single (12EM 18)
 "Some People" (Extended Version)
 "One Time Lover Man"
 "Reunion of the Heart"

UK CD video single (EMCDV 3)
 "My Pretty One" (audio only)
 "Reunion of the Heart" (audio only)
 "Under the Gun" (audio only)
 "Remember Me" (audio only)
 "Some People" (video)

Charts

Weekly charts

Year-end charts

Certifications

References

1987 singles
1987 songs
Cliff Richard songs
Song recordings produced by Alan Tarney
Songs written by Alan Tarney